Pranahita Pushkaralu is a festival of River Pranahita normally occurs once in 12 years. The Pushkaram is observed for a period  of 12 days from the time of entry of Jupiter into Pisces (Meena rasi).

See also
Godavari Pushkaralu
Pushkaram

References

Festivals in Telangana
Water and Hinduism
Hindu festivals
Religious tourism in India
Hindu pilgrimages